The Power of Kangwon Province (강원도의 힘, Gangwon-do ui him) is the second film by South Korean director Hong Sang-soo.  It follows the lives of a man and a woman who have decided to end their affair. It was screened in the Un Certain Regard section at the 1998 Cannes Film Festival.

Plot
Three young girls, Jisook, Misun and Eunkyoung take a trip to the mountainous Kangwon Province of South Korea. Jisook has just broken up with another married man, and she is lonely and unhappy with her current situation. They meet a young policeman who shows them around and after a meal where they all get drunk together, Jisook ends up passing out with the policeman in her bed, but not having sex. He is married, but Jisook returns another day to see him and they end up falling-over drunk again. 

The second half the film then follows the situation of Sangwon, the married man that Jisook has just broken up with. In a typically symmetrical fashion, after a repeat scene where it becomes apparent that both of them are on the same train, Sangwon also visits the Kangwon Province with a friend and the paths of the two characters cross without them ever meeting there, both of them encountering a couple involved in a murder investigation.

See also
List of Korean-language films

References

External links
 IMDb entry

1998 films
1998 drama films
South Korean drama films
South Korean anthology films
Films set in Gangwon Province, South Korea
Films directed by Hong Sang-soo
1980s Korean-language films